18 Years Later is a 2010 Italian comedy-drama film written, directed and starring Edoardo Leo. The film also won several awards in a number of international film festivals, including the Audience Award at the Annecy Italian Film Festival and the awards for best film, best director, best actor and best actress at the 2010 Ibiza International Film Festival.

Cast

See also    
 List of Italian films of 2010

References

External links

Films set in Italy
2010 directorial debut films
2010 films
Italian road comedy-drama films
2010s road comedy-drama films
Films directed by Edoardo Leo
2010s Italian films
2010s Italian-language films